Polish People's Party "Piast" or Polish Peasant Party "Piast" (PSL Piast) was a political party from the interwar period of the Second Polish Republic (1913–1931). Piast refers to the medieval  Piast dynasty, Poland's founding royal house.

PSL Piast was an important political party in the Second Polish Republic. It was created in 1913 and after Poland regained independence in 1918, it formed a part of several governments, most notably after the Lanckorona Pact and in the Chjeno-Piast coalition. In 1931 it formed the People's Party. Its major politicians included Wincenty Witos, Jakub Bojko, Jan Dąbski, Maciej Rataj and Władysław Kiernik.

Election Results

Sejm

See also
Polish People's Party

1913 establishments in Poland
1931 disestablishments in Poland
Agrarian parties in Poland
Christian democratic parties in Europe
Conservative parties in Poland
Defunct political parties in Poland
Piast
Political parties disestablished in 1931
Political parties established in 1913